The Military Order of the Cootie of the United States (MOC, or simply Military Order of the Cootie) is a national honor degree membership association separately constituted as a subordinate and as an auxiliary order chartered by the Veterans of Foreign Wars of the United States (VFW). The organization's services include supporting the VFW National Home for Children and veterans hospitals. Founded in 1920, it became a subsidiary of the VFW in 1923.

History
The order (originally known as the Military Order of the Cootie, U.S.A.) was established on September 17, 1920, in Washington, D.C., by Fred C. Madden and F. L. Gransbury. The organization was modeled after the Imperial Order of the Dragon, an auxiliary to the United Spanish American War Veterans. The name "cootie" is a reference to the lice that plagued soldiers in World War I. Cooties were credited with keeping soldiers' heads down in the trenches. A meeting of cooties is called a "scratch", the local chapter a "Pup Tent", the state affiliate a "Grand", and the national headquarters at Turtle Creek, Pennsylvania, "The Supreme."

Notable members 
Notable members of the Military Order of the Cootie have included:

See also
 List of veterans organizations

References

External links

 
 
 Veterans of Foreign Wars National Home for Children in Eaton Rapids, Michigan
 

501(c)(19) nonprofit organizations
1920 establishments in Washington, D.C.
Aftermath of World War I in the United States
American veterans' organizations
Fraternal orders
Honor societies
Non-profit organizations based in Pennsylvania
Organizations established in 1920
Patriotic societies
Veterans of Foreign Wars